Steelmaking is the process of producing steel from iron ore and/or scrap.  In steelmaking, impurities such as nitrogen, silicon, phosphorus, sulfur and excess carbon (the most important impurity) are removed from the sourced iron, and alloying elements such as manganese, nickel, chromium, carbon and vanadium are added to produce different grades of steel. Limiting dissolved gases such as nitrogen and oxygen and entrained impurities (termed "inclusions") in the steel is also important to ensure the quality of the products cast from the liquid steel.

Steelmaking has existed for millennia, but it was not commercialized on a massive scale until the mid-19th century. An ancient process of steelmaking was the crucible process. In the 1850s and 1860s, the Bessemer process and the Siemens-Martin process turned steelmaking into a heavy industry. Today there are two major commercial processes for making steel, namely basic oxygen steelmaking, which has liquid pig-iron from the blast furnace and scrap steel as the main feed materials, and electric arc furnace (EAF) steelmaking, which uses scrap steel or direct reduced iron (DRI) as the main feed materials. Oxygen steelmaking is fueled predominantly by the exothermic nature of the reactions inside the vessel; in contrast, in EAF steelmaking, electrical energy is used to melt the solid scrap and/or DRI materials. In recent times, EAF steelmaking technology has evolved closer to oxygen steelmaking as more chemical energy is introduced into the process.

Steelmaking is one of the most carbon emission intensive industries in the world. , steelmaking is estimated to be responsible for  7 to 9 per cent of all direct fossil fuel greenhouse gas emissions. In order to mitigate global warming, the industry will need to find reductions in emissions. In 2020, McKinsey identified a number of technologies for decarbonization including hydrogen usage, carbon capture and reuse, and maximizing use of electric arc furnaces powered by clean energy.

History

Steelmaking has played a crucial role in the development of ancient, medieval, and modern technological societies. Early processes of steel making were made during the classical era in Ancient Iran, Ancient China, India, and Rome.

Cast iron is a hard, brittle material that is difficult to work, whereas steel is malleable, relatively easily formed and a versatile material. For much of human history, steel has only been made in small quantities. Since the invention of the Bessemer process in 19th century Britain and subsequent technological developments in injection technology and process control, mass production of steel has become an integral part of the global economy and a key indicator of modern technological development. The earliest means of producing steel was in a bloomery.

Early modern methods of producing steel were often labour-intensive and highly skilled arts.  See:
finery forge, in which the German finery process could be managed to produce steel.
blister steel and crucible steel.

An important aspect of the Industrial Revolution was the development of large-scale methods of producing forgeable metal (bar iron or steel). The puddling furnace was initially a means of producing wrought iron but was later applied to steel production.

The real revolution in modern steelmaking only began at the end of the 1850s when the Bessemer process became the first successful method of steelmaking in high quantity followed by the open-hearth furnace.

Modern processes for manufacturing of steel

Modern steelmaking processes can be divided into three steps: primary, secondary and tertiary.

Primary steelmaking involves smelting iron into steel. Secondary steelmaking involves adding or removing other elements such as alloying agents and dissolved gases. Tertiary steelmaking involves casting into sheets, rolls or other forms. Multiple techniques are available for each step.

Primary steelmaking

Basic oxygen 
Basic oxygen steelmaking is a method of primary steelmaking in which carbon-rich pig iron is melted and converted into steel. Refractories—calcium oxide and magnesium oxide—line the smelting vessel to withstand the high temperature and corrosive nature of the molten metal and slag. The chemistry of the process is controlled to ensure that impurities such as silicon and phosphorus are removed from the metal.

The modern process was developed in 1948 by Robert Durrer, as a refinement of the Bessemer converter that replaced air with more efficient oxygen. It reduced the capital cost of the plants and smelting time, and increased labor productivity. Between 1920 and 2000, labour requirements in the industry decreased by a factor of 1000, to just 0.003 man-hours per tonne. in 2013, 70% of global steel output was produced using the basic oxygen furnace. Furnaces can convert up to 350 tons of iron into steel in less than 40 minutes compared to 10–12 hours in an open hearth furnace.

Electric arc 
Electric arc furnace steelmaking is the manufacture of steel from scrap or direct reduced iron melted by electric arcs. In an electric arc furnace, a batch ("heat") of iron is loaded into the furnace, sometimes with a "hot heel" (molten steel from a previous heat). Gas burners may be used to assist with the melt. As in basic oxygen steelmaking, fluxes are also added to protect the lining of the vessel and help improve the removal of impurities. Electric arc furnace steelmaking typically uses furnaces of capacity around 100 tonnes that produce steel every 40 to 50 minutes. This process allows larger alloy additions than the basic oxygen method.

HIsarna process 

In HIsarna ironmaking process, iron ore is processed almost directly into liquid iron or hot metal. The process is based around a type of blast furnace called a cyclone converter furnace, which makes it possible to skip the process of manufacturing pig iron pellets that is necessary for the basic oxygen steelmaking process. Without the necessity of this preparatory step, the HIsarna process is more energy-efficient and has a lower carbon footprint than traditional steelmaking processes.

Hydrogen reduction 

Steel can be produced from direct-reduced iron, which in turn can be produced from iron ore as it undergoes chemical reduction with hydrogen. Renewable hydrogen allows steelmaking without the use of fossil fuels. In 2021, a pilot plant in Sweden tested this process. The iron is infused with carbon (from coal) in an electric arc furnace. Hydrogen produced by electrolysis requires approximately 2600 kWh per ton of steel. Costs are estimated to be 20-30% higher than conventional methods.

Secondary steelmaking 
Secondary steelmaking is most commonly performed in ladles. Some of the operations performed in ladles include de-oxidation (or "killing"), vacuum degassing, alloy addition, inclusion removal, inclusion chemistry modification, de-sulphurisation, and homogenisation. It is now common to perform ladle metallurgical operations in gas-stirred ladles with electric arc heating in the lid of the furnace. Tight control of ladle metallurgy is associated with producing high grades of steel in which the tolerances in chemistry and consistency are narrow.

Carbon dioxide emissions
, steelmaking is estimated to be responsible for around 11% of the global emissions of carbon dioxide and around 7% of the global greenhouse gas emissions. Making 1 ton of steel produces about 1.8 tons of carbon dioxide. The bulk of these emissions results from the industrial process in which coal is used as the source of carbon that removes oxygen from iron ore in the following chemical reaction, which occurs in a blast furnace:

Fe2O3(s) + 3 CO(g) → 2 Fe(s) + 3 CO2(g)

Additional carbon dioxide emissions result from basic oxygen steelmaking, calcination, and the hot blast. Carbon capture and utilization or carbon capture and storage are proposed techniques to reduce the carbon dioxide emissions in the steel industry and reduction of iron ore using green hydrogen rather than carbon. See below for further decarbonization strategies.

Blast furnace

To make pure steel, iron and carbon are needed. On its own, iron is not very strong, but a low concentration of carbon - less than 1 percent, depending on the kind of steel, gives the steel its important properties. The carbon in steel is obtained from coal and the iron from iron ore. However, iron ore is a mixture of iron and oxygen, and other trace elements. To make steel, the iron needs to be separated from the oxygen and a tiny amount of carbon needs to be added. Both are accomplished by melting the iron ore at a very high temperature (1,700 degrees Celsius or over 3,000 degrees Fahrenheit) in the presence of oxygen (from the air) and a type of coal called coke. At those temperatures, the iron ore releases its oxygen, which is carried away by the carbon from the coke in the form of carbon dioxide.

Fe2O3(s) + 3 CO(g) → 2 Fe(s) + 3 CO2(g)

The reaction occurs due to the lower (favorable) energy state of carbon dioxide compared to iron oxide, and the high temperatures are needed to achieve the activation energy for this reaction. A small amount of carbon bonds with the iron, forming pig iron, which is an intermediary before steel, as it has carbon content that is too high - around 4%.

Decarburization

To reduce the carbon content in pig iron and obtain the desired carbon content of steel, the pig iron is re-melted and oxygen is blown through in a process called basic oxygen steelmaking, which occurs in a ladle. In this step, the oxygen binds with the undesired carbon, carrying it away in the form of  carbon dioxide gas, an additional source of emissions. After this step, the carbon content in the pig iron is lowered sufficiently and steel is obtained.

Calcination

Further carbon dioxide emissions result from the use of limestone, which is melted at high temperatures in a reaction called calcination, which has the following chemical reaction:

CaCO3(s) → CaO(s) + CO2(g)

Carbon dioxide is an additional source of emissions in this reaction. Modern industry has introduced calcium oxide (CaO, quicklime) as an replacement. It acts as a chemical flux, removing impurities (such as Sulfur or Phosphorus (e.g. apatite or fluorapatite)) in the form of slag and keeps emissions of CO2 low. For example, the calcium oxide can react to remove silicon oxide impurities:

SiO2 + CaO → CaSiO3

This use of limestone to provide a flux occurs both in the blast furnace (to obtain pig iron) and in the basic oxygen steel making (to obtain steel).

Hot blast

Further carbon dioxide emissions result from the hot blast, which is used to increase the heat of the blast furnace. The hot blast pumps hot air into the blast furnace where the iron ore is reduced to pig iron, helping to achieve the high activation energy. The hot blast temperature can be from 900 °C to 1300 °C (1600 °F to 2300 °F) depending on the stove design and condition. Oil, tar, natural gas, powdered coal and oxygen can also be injected into the furnace to combine with the coke to release additional energy and increase the percentage of reducing gases present, increasing productivity. If the air in the hot blast is heated by burning fossil fuels, which often is the case, this is an additional source of carbon dioxide emissions.

Strategies for reducing carbon emissions 
There are several carbon abatement and decarbonization strategies in the steelmaking industry.

Top gas recovery in BF/BOF 
Top gas from the blast furnace is the gas that is normally exhausted into the air during steelmaking. This gas contains CO2 and is also rich in the reducing agents of H2 and CO. To reduce emissions, the top gas can be captured, the CO2 removed (and then stored geologically), and the reducing agents reinjected into the blast furnace. According to one study this process can reduce BF CO2 emissions by 75%; another study states that the emissions are reduced by 56.5% with the carbon capture and storage and reduced by 26.2% if only the recycling of the reducing agents is used. Another way to use the top gas would be in a Top Recovery Turbine which then generates electricity and reduces the energy intensity of the process.

Using biomass in BF/BOF 
In steelmaking, coal and coke are used for fuel and iron reduction. If instead biomass can be used, such as charcoal or wood pellets, then emissions can be reduced by 5% to 28% of current CO2 emissions. This replacement does depend on the local availability of biomass.

Scrap-use in BF/BOF 
Scrap in steelmaking refers to steel that has either reached its end of life use or was generated during the manufacture of steel components. Steel is easy to separate and recycle due to its inherent magnetism and using scrap avoids the emissions of 1.5 tons of CO2 for every ton of scrap used. Currently, steel recycling is high, with all the scrap being collected also being recycled in the steel industry. As more buildings and infrastructure reach their end of life, ensuring that collection and recycling of this scrap remains in place is crucial to keeping CO2 emissions in steelmaking as low as possible.

H2 enrichment in BF/BOF 
In the blast furnace, the iron oxides are reduced by a combination of CO, H2, and carbon. Only around 10% of the iron oxides are reduced by H2. With H2 enrichment processing, the proportion of iron oxides reduced by H2 is increased, so that less carbon is consumed and less CO2 is emitted. This process can reduce emissions by an estimated 20%.

Carbon capture and sequestration in BF/BOF 
Carbon capture and sequestration from the top gas in the blast furnace was discussed above. There are additional points where carbon can be captured, such as from gasses in the coke oven. Some of the challenges of implementing CCS include separating the CO2 from other gasses and components in the system and the relatively high cost of the equipment and infrastructure changes needed to implement this strategy. But if CCS is implemented in the steel industry, emissions could be reduced on a large scale, up to 65% to 80%.

Green H2 in DRI/EAF 
Hydrogen reduction was explained above. As mentioned, if the hydrogen for this is produced in a carbon free way (i.e. produced from water using clean sources such as wind, solar and nuclear), then this process becomes carbon free. In addition, the electric arc furnace is run by electricity. If this electricity is also from a clean source, then no fossil fuels are used in the process of steelmaking. Therefore, the CO2 reduction can reach 100% for this process. There are several projects undertaking this hydrogen-based steel production in Europe, such as projects from HYBRIT, LKAB, Voestalpine, and ThyssenKrupp.

The HIsarna process 
The HIsarna ironmaking process was described above as a way of producing iron in a cyclone converter furnace without the pre-processing steps of choking/agglomeration, which reduces the CO2 emissions by around 20%.

Hydrogen plasma 
There is a current ongoing project by SuSteel to develop a hydrogen plasma technology that (1) reduces the oxides with hydrogen as opposed to with CO or carbon and (2) melts the iron at high operating temperatures. This project is still at the developmental stage, but is another way to reduce emissions up to 100%.

Iron ore electrolysis 
In iron ore electrolysis, the reducing agent is simply electrons (as opposed to H2, CO, or carbon) and so carbon emissions can be reduced to 100%. One method for this is molten oxide electrolysis. Here, the cell consists of an inert anode, a liquid oxide electrolyte (CaO, MgO, etc.), and the molten steel. When heated, the iron ore is reduced to iron and oxygen. Boston Metal is at the semi-industrial stage for this process, with plans to reach commercialization by 2026. Expanding a pilot plant in Woburn, Massachusetts and building a production facility in Brazil, it was founded by MIT professors Donald Sadoway and Antoine Allanore.

Outlook 
Overall, there are a number of innovative methods to reduce CO2 emissions within the steelmaking industry. Some of these, such as top gas recovery and using hydrogen reduction in DRI/EAF are highly feasible with current infrastructure and technology levels. Others, such as hydrogen plasma and iron ore electrolysis are still in the research or semi-industrial stage, but have the potential to completely transform the steel industry.

See also 
 History of the steel industry (1850–1970)
 History of the steel industry (1970–present)
Argon oxygen decarburization
Decarburization
FINEX
Flodin process
Steel mill
Carbon additive
Metallurgical coal
Blast furnace 
Calcination
Basic oxygen steelmaking

References

External links

U.S. Steel Gary Works Photograph Collection, 1906–1971
 "Steel For The Tools For Victory" , December 1943, Popular Science large detailed article with numerous illustrations and cutaways on the modern basics of making steel

 
Ancient Roman technology
Chinese inventions
English inventions
Indian inventions
Industrial Revolution in England